Rural sociology is a field of sociology traditionally associated with the study of social structure and conflict in rural areas. It is an active academic field in much of the world, originating in the United States in the 1910s with close ties to the national Department of Agriculture and land-grant university colleges of agriculture.

While the issue of natural resource access transcends traditional rural spatial boundaries, the sociology of food and agriculture is one focus of rural sociology, and much of the field is dedicated to the economics of farm production. Other areas of study include rural migration and other demographic patterns, environmental sociology, amenity-led development, public-lands policies, so-called "boomtown" development, social disruption, the sociology of natural resources (including forests, mining, fishing and other areas), rural cultures and identities, rural health-care, and educational policies. Many rural sociologists work in the areas of development studies, community studies, community development, and environmental studies. Much of the research involves developing countries or the Third World.

History

United States
Rural sociology was a concept first brought by Americans in response to the large amounts of people living and working on the grounds of farms.  Rural sociology was the first and for a time the largest branch of American sociology. Histories of the field were popular in the 1950s and 1960s.

Europe
Rural sociology in Europe developed not in the old established universities but in the new countries that emerged after 1919 and were strongly influenced by the political philosophy of Agrarianism, which promoted the farmer as the strength of society. Czechoslovakia opened three research centers, and others opened in Romania and Yugoslavia.

Mission statements
The mission statements of university departments of rural sociology have expanded to include more topics, such as sustainable development. For example, at the University of Missouri the mission is:

"The Department of Rural Sociology at the University of Missouri employs the theoretical and methodological tools of rural sociology to address challenges of the 21st century – preserving our natural resources, providing safe and nutritious food for an expanding population, adapting to climate changes, and maintaining sustainable rural livelihoods."

The University of Wisconsin set up one of the first departments of rural sociology. It has now dropped the term "rural" and changed its name to the "Department of Community and Environmental Sociology." Similarly, the Rural Sociology Program at the University of Kentucky has evolved into the. "Department of Community and Leadership Development," while transferring the graduate program in rural sociology to the Sociology Department. Cornell University's department of rural sociology has also changed its name to the department of Development Sociology.

Associations 
Scholarly associations in rural sociology include:
 The Rural Sociological Society (RSS), of the United States, was formed in 1937 after years of discussion as a spinoff of the American Sociological Society. It publishes the scholarly quarterly journal Rural Sociology. The full run of back issues is online from 1936 to 1989 through Cornell University Library's program of putting online core historical resources in rural sociology.
 The European Society for Rural Sociology (ESRS) was founded in 1957. It says it is "the leading European association for scientists involved in the study of agriculture and fisheries, food production and consumption, rural development and change, rurality and cultural heritage, equality and inequality in rural society, and nature and environmental care."
 The International Rural Sociology Association (IRSA) has as its mission, to "foster the development of rural sociology; further the application of sociological inquiry to the improvement of the quality of rural life; and provide a mechanism whereby rural sociologists can generate dialogue and useful exchange." It published the  International Journal of Sociology of Agriculture and Food.
 The International Association for Society and Natural Resources (IASNR) publishes the journal, Society & Natural Resources.

Journals 
Several academic journals are published in the field of (or closely related to) rural sociology, including:
 
 Agriculture and Human Values
 Journal of Agrarian Change
 Journal of Peasant Studies
 Journal of Rural Studies
 Rural Sociology
 Society & Natural Resources
 Sociologia Ruralis

See also 
Food studies
Highland Clearances
Regional science
Rural development
Rural ghetto
Rural history
Sociology of disaster

References

Further reading 
 Brunner, E. d. The Growth of a Science: A Half-Century of Rural Sociological Research in the United States (Harper & Brothers, 1957). 
 Friedland, W. H. "The End of Rural Society and the Future of Rural Sociology." Rural Sociology (1982) 47(4): 589–608.
 Goreham, Gary A. ed. The Encyclopedia of Rural America: The Land and People (2 Volume, 2nd ed. 2008), 1341pp
 Hanson, Victor Davis. The Other Greeks: The Family Farm and the Agrarian Roots of Western Civilization (1999) excerpt and text search
 Nelson, L. Rural Sociology: Its Origins and Growth in the United States (University of Minnesota Press, 1969). 
 Rani, Asha and Gajanafar Alam. Encyclopaedia of Urban & Rural Sociology : Social & Psychological Behaviour (3 Vol, 2012) 
 Smith, Suzanne. "The Institutional and Intellectual Origins of Rural Sociology" (Paper for 2011 Rural Sociology Assn. meeting) online
 Sorokin, Pitirim A., Carle Zimmerman and Charles Galpin. A Systematic Source Book In Rural Sociology (3 vol 1931) excerpt and text search v 1; world perspective
 Sorokin, Pitirim A. and C. C. Zimmerman Principles of Rural-Urban Sociology (1929), world perspective
 Thomas, William I., and Florian Znaniecki. The Polish Peasant in Europe and America (2 vol. 1918); classic sociological study; complete text online free

External links
 European Society for Rural Sociology
 Rural Sociological Society
 Rural Sociology back issues, 1938-1989